Beat Beat Heartbeat was the first full-length album released by The Natural History on May 20, 2003.

Track listing
 "Facts Are" – 2:33
 "Watch This House" – 1:43
 "The Right Hand" – 2:58
 "It's a Law" – 1:46
 "Broken Language" – 1:45
 "Beat Beat" – 2:49
 "Run de Run" – 2:43
 "Do What You Should" – 1:49
 "Hours from My Life" – 3:06
 "Telling Lies Will Get You Nowhere" – 2:43
 "Dance Steps" – 3:41

Video
"Watch This House"

Reviews
PopMatters review
PunkNews review
Pitchfork Media review

2003 albums
The Natural History (band) albums
Startime International albums